Populicerus is a genus of true bugs belonging to the family Cicadellidae.

The species of this genus are found in Europe and Northern America.

Species:
 Populicerus albicans (Kirschbaum, 1868) 
 Populicerus ambigenus Dubovskiy, 1966

References

Cicadellidae
Hemiptera genera